Brampton Racecourse is a  biological Site of Special Scientific Interest north of Brampton in Cambridgeshire. The site is also a horse racing venue called Huntingdon Racecourse.

The site is species-rich neutral grassland, a rare habitat in the county, in the flood plain of Alconbury Brook. Plants include salad burnet, pepper-saxifrage, and the largest population in of green-winged orchid in Cambridgeshire.

References

Sites of Special Scientific Interest in Cambridgeshire